Robert Steven "Adrian" Belew (born December 23, 1949) is an American musician, singer, songwriter, and record producer. A multi-instrumentalist primarily known as a guitarist and singer, he is noted for his unusual and impressionistic approach to his guitar tones (which, rather than relying on standard instrumental tones, often resemble sound effects or noises made by animals and machines).

Widely recognized as an "incredibly versatile player", Belew is perhaps best known for his long career as singer and guitarist in the progressive rock group King Crimson between 1981 and 2009. He has also released nearly twenty solo albums for Island Records and Atlantic Records in a range of blended or alternated styles including art rock, New Wave, Beatles-inspired pop-rock, progressive rock and experimental noise. In addition, Belew has been a member of the intermittently active pop band the Bears, and fronted GaGa in the late 1970s and early 1980s.
 
Belew has worked extensively as a session, guest and touring musician, including periods with the Frank Zappa and David Bowie bands, Talking Heads, Laurie Anderson, and Nine Inch Nails, as well as contributing to hit singles by Paul Simon, Tom Tom Club, and others. He released a top-10 single in 1989 with "Oh Daddy", and his 2005 single "Beat Box Guitar" was nominated for a Grammy for Best Rock Instrumental Performance. Belew has also worked in instrument design and multimedia, collaborating with Parker Guitars to help design his Parker Fly signature guitar, and designing his own iOS mobile apps, "FLUX by belew" and "FLUX:FX, the multi-effect audio processor app."

Biography

Early life (1949–1977)
Robert Steven Belew was born into a middle-class family in Covington, Kentucky, on December 23, 1949. Initially known to friends and classmates as "Steve", he played drums in his teen years, playing with the Ludlow High School marching band and later with the high school cover band the Denems. Inspired by Jimi Hendrix, he took up guitar while he was bedridden for several months with mononucleosis. At the age of 17, he was further inspired by a club performance of blues rock guitar soloing pioneer Lonnie Mack, who later became a close friend. 

Not inclined to formal music study, Belew was nonetheless a quick developer and rapidly became a high school guitar hero. Mostly teaching himself by listening to records, he was ignorant of the studio trickery and sound manipulation used to create particular guitar lines, and so found ways of replicating them himself manually using unusual playing techniques and a growing interest in effects and treatments. While maturing as a player and mastering various playing styles, Belew became increasingly preoccupied with ways to avoid "sounding like everybody else". He eventually found his own sound and style by learning how to make his guitar mimic sound effects such as car horns, animal noises, or industrial sounds and then applying those sounds to relatively standard songs.

In the mid-1970s, Belew began using the first name "Adrian" and moved to Nashville to pursue a full-time career as a professional musician. By 1977, he was playing with the regionally popular cover band Sweetheart, but wondering whether (at age 27) he had missed his chance to make a living with original music.

Work with Frank Zappa (1977–1978)
In 1977, while playing at a Sweetheart gig at Fanny's Bar in Nashville, Belew was discovered by Frank Zappa, who had been tipped off regarding the band's talents by his chauffeur. Zappa approached Belew and discussed auditioning him for an upcoming tour, although Belew did not receive an official invitation to audition for the better part of a year. During this time Sweetheart split up. Once the formal invitation came, Belew flew out to Los Angeles and found himself auditioning alongside more formally trained musicians. Believing that he'd messed up his first audition, Belew persuaded Zappa to give him a second one. Belew's second audition was a more intimate one-on-one experience which took place in Zappa's living room. Zappa was impressed enough to hire Belew on a handshake deal for a year.

Belew toured with the Zappa band and appeared on Zappa's 1979 album Sheik Yerbouti, as well as Zappa's 1979 concert film, Baby Snakes, a document of the October 1977 Halloween week shows at New York City's Palladium. While with Zappa, Belew was mostly credited as a rhythm guitarist although he also played lead, melody, or noise lines, as well as singing lead on two songs ("Jones Crusher" and "City of Tiny Lites"). According to Belew, "Frank either played or sang, never both at the same time, so ultimately my role became covering his parts. When he sang I played his guitar part. When he played I sang his vocal part." He also took on the role of band clown, performing impressions (such as the Bob Dylan impersonation on the song "Flakes"), wearing unusual clothing and performing visual stunts. ("Need someone to wear a flashing helmet and bounce around like a robot? How about Adrian? Need someone to wear a dress onstage? There’s always Adrian.")

Belew has described his year in Zappa's band as a "crash course" in music theory due to Zappa's rigorous rehearsals and often technically demanding music, and has commented, "I went to the Frank Zappa School of Rock."

Work with David Bowie (1978–1979)

On the recommendation of musician/producer Brian Eno, after seeing a Zappa concert in Cologne, Germany, David Bowie offered to hire Belew once the Zappa tour was finished. Belew accepted the offer, as Zappa intended to spend four months editing the film Baby Snakes. Belew then played on Bowie's Isolar II Tour in 1978; he played on the double-live album Stage, and also contributed to Bowie's next album, Lodger. Twelve years later, he returned to working with Bowie, acting as musical director on the 1990 Sound+Vision Tour, while also playing guitar and singing.

Talking Heads, GaGa and the Tom Tom Club (1979–1982)

In 1980, Belew formed a new band, GaGa (based in Urbana, Illinois, where he resided at the time), for which he served as the singer, guitarist and primary songwriter (as well as, via backing tapes, the drummer). By now a frequent visitor to New York City, Belew had also become friends with the up-and-coming new wave/art-rock band Talking Heads. Invited to join the band onstage for performances of their signature song "Psycho Killer," Belew impressed them with his wild and unorthodox guitar soloing and became an occasional guest performer at live concerts. Around this time, Belew also met King Crimson guitarist Robert Fripp at a Steve Reich concert. In July of that year, GaGa was invited to open several New York City-area concerts for Fripp's band, the League of Gentlemen.

At the same time, Belew had been tapped by Talking Heads and their producer Brian Eno (with whom he'd worked on Lodger) to add guitar solos to several tracks on the Remain in Light album. He was subsequently added to the expanded nine-piece Talking Heads live band for tours in late 1980 and early 1981. These concerts were documented in the DVD Live in Roma and in the second half of the band's 1982 live album, The Name of This Band is Talking Heads. Belew's involvement with Talking Heads extended to playing on the band's spin-off projects. He played on keyboard player/guitarist Jerry Harrison's debut album, The Red and the Black, and on several tracks on David Byrne's soundtrack to the Twyla Tharp dance piece, The Catherine Wheel (with his guitar noises credited, amongst other things, as "beasts").

At the time, the internal relationships in Talking Heads were particularly strained. The band's married rhythm section, Tina Weymouth and Chris Frantz, allegedly approached Belew with the suggestion that he should replace Byrne as the band's frontman, an offer which Belew immediately but politely turned down. (In his book "Remain in Love", Frantz denied that this offer was ever made.) Belew did, however, go on to work with Weymouth and Frantz on their own spin-off project, Tom Tom Club. Joining them for recordings at Compass Point Studios in Nassau, Bahamas, Belew played rhythm guitar on the sessions for the band's debut album, as well as adding his trademark processed solos (and even performing the entire instrumentation for the track "L'Elephant").

Unfortunately, Belew's experience with Tom Tom Club was less harmonious than his previous work with Talking Heads. Tom Tom Club's recording engineer, Steven Stanley, was vocal about his dislike of distorted guitar and erased the majority of Belew's solos during the mixing sessions. Worse was to follow when Belew queried Weymouth about songwriting credits, having co-written several of the album's songs in addition to his playing. He was apparently "ghosted", with Weymouth no longer returning his phone calls. Belew did not play live with Tom Tom Club or contribute to any further sessions. Recalling the situation when interviewed twenty years later, he claimed that he had opted to pursue other work rather than involve himself in legal or personal struggles with Weymouth and Frantz, and that he had chosen not to let it bother him, as several other, more promising projects were happening for him at the same time.

Beginning of solo career (1981)

By now Belew's rising profile had gained him a solo record contract with Island Records. During the recording of the debut Tom Tom Club album, members of GaGa had joined Belew at Compass Point and backed him on a set of parallel sessions which would result in Belew's first solo album, 1982's Lone Rhino. The album provided a home for various GaGa songs and blended various elements of Belew's work over the past decade, including snappy and noisy Zappa/Byrne-influenced songs, dabblings in world music, opportunities for animal/mechanical sounds on guitar, and sonic experiments reminiscent of Jimi Hendrix or the Beatles. It also included an instrumental duet between Belew and his four-year-old daughter Audie (the latter improvising on acoustic piano, with Belew adding a processed guitar counterpoint).

King Crimson (1981–2013)

Adrian Belew was the singer, second guitarist and frontman (as well as occasional drummer) for King Crimson from 1981 to 2009, one of the longest tenures in King Crimson by anyone other than founder Robert Fripp. He maintained this position despite several splits or hiatuses in group activity, and notwithstanding a brief period in the early 1990s when Fripp unsuccessfully invited singer David Sylvian to front a possible new version of the band.

Belew's involvement with the band began while he was still involved with Talking Heads. Having been impressed by Belew's work with GaGa and David Bowie, Fripp asked Belew to join his new four-piece band (at that time called Discipline) as singer and second guitarist. At the time, Belew was busy not just with Talking Heads but also with the imminent Tom Tom Club sessions and the recording of his debut solo album. However, he realized that Talking Heads' internal politics would eventually either sideline or obstruct him (coupled with the fact that the band looked as if it would be on hiatus for a while). Belew opted to uncouple himself from Talking Heads and join Fripp, with whom he would have more opportunities to develop and express himself. One of his conditions for joining the new band was that he would be allowed time to continue and develop his new solo career, to which Fripp agreed.

The Discipline lineup was completed by the former King Crimson drummer Bill Bruford and the New York session ace Tony Levin on bass guitar and Chapman Stick. During initial touring, the members of the band discussed the possibility of renaming themselves King Crimson. This had not been the original intention for the band, but all members generally agreed that this would be both appropriate and useful. This made Belew the first guitarist to formally play alongside Fripp within King Crimson on an equal footing (although both Ian McDonald and John Wetton had occasionally contributed extra guitar to previous King Crimson recordings). He was also the first King Crimson singer to write all of his own lyrics.

The renamed band released and toured the well-received Discipline album later in 1981, bringing Belew further acclaim. The follow-up, 1982's Beat, proved harder to record. Finding himself responsible for the bulk of the band's songwriting and dealing with the extra pressures of being the frontman in a high-level group, Belew squabbled with Fripp over the group's approach and sound. Disagreements were mostly resolved and the band continued to find success as a live act. However, 1984's Three of a Perfect Pair proved tortuous to write, and although King Crimson eventually created another successful album (including some Belew experiments with fretless guitar), Fripp opted to split the band in 1984. The live album Absent Lovers: Live in Montreal (originally a radio broadcast, released as an album in 1998) captured the band in full force on their last gig.

Despite the disagreements of the time, the members of the 1981–1984 King Crimson maintained enough camaraderie and mutual respect to reunite in 1994 (adding second drummer Pat Mastellotto and Warr Guitarist Trey Gunn) with Belew continuing as the band's singer, guitarist, and frontman. The six-piece King Crimson toured successfully and were together until 1997, releasing the THRAK album and several live recordings. From 1997 onward, Belew participated in several of the ProjeKcts, a series of instrumental and experimental King Crimson side projects active during the band's hiatuses, in which he predominantly played electronic drums.

Belew was a member of the slimmed-down quartet version of King Crimson (minus Bruford and Levin) which played and recorded between 2000 and 2004, releasing the construKction of light and The Power to Believe (in addition to several live albums and EPs), as well as touring as an opening act for Tool in 2001. After a further four-year hiatus, the band returned to active work in 2008 as a five-piece (with the addition of Porcupine Tree drummer Gavin Harrison, and Levin returning to replace Gunn). From 2000 through 2008, King Crimson used Belew's studio at his home outside Mount Juliet, Tennessee, for rehearsals and recording.

In September 2013, following yet another four-year band hiatus, Fripp announced the formation of a new seven-piece King Crimson which did not include Belew. Belew stated on his Facebook page that Fripp had told him that he "would not be right" for what Fripp had in mind for the new version of the band.

Solo career, part two (1983–1986)

Following the release of his first solo album Lone Rhino in 1982, Belew recorded a 1983 follow-up called Twang Bar King, which once again featured GaGa as backing band (now augmented by former Elvis Presley drummer Larrie Londin).

His next solo album was recorded in 1986, and was an experimental all-instrumental album of processed guitar, guitar synthesizer, and percussion called Desire Caught By the Tail. Belew has subsequently claimed that the record cost him his contract with Island Records due to its highly uncommercial nature.

From 1986 to 1989, Belew's solo career was on hold while he concentrated on the Bears.

The Bears (1985–1989, 1997–present)

Following King Crimson's breakup/entry into hiatus in 1984, Belew formed the pop band the Bears with fellow guitarist and singer Rob Fetters, drummer Chris Arduser, and bass guitarist Bob Nyswonger. All three were close friends of Belew whom he'd met during his Sweetheart days in the mid-1970s, and were also ex-members of the Raisins, a Cincinnati-based band that had some local success in the early 1980s and had an album produced by Belew.

As a band, the Bears was a conscious attempt to create a more unified and collective group, with Belew and Fetters sharing lead vocal duties. Although Belew's guitar skills were still in evidence, they took second place to the band's commitment to songs. Signing to the I.R.S. Records subsidiary Primitive Man Recording Company, the Bears recorded and released two albums, 1987's The Bears, and 1988's Rise and Shine. After three years of constant recording, promotion, and touring, the band broke up in 1989 following the collapse of PMRC. The success of Belew's solo hit single "Oh Daddy" led to him touring with David Bowie. The remaining three Bears regrouped as psychodots.

All four musicians remained friends, stayed in contact with each other, and continued to help each other. Arduser drummed on Belew's 1992 solo album, Inner Revolution (with Fetters joining the 1992 touring band). On the tour supporting Belew's Here album in 1994, psychodots played as both the opening act and as Belew's backing band. Belew would also co-write two songs on Rob Fetters' Lefty Loose – Righty Tight album in 1998.

Since 1997, the Bears have regularly reunited in the studio for intermittent recording sessions. This has resulted in two further albums to date, 2001's Car Caught Fire, and 2007's Eureka. The band perform short tours to promote the releases and continue to work together around the varied schedules of all four members.

Solo career, part three (1989–present)

Belew revived his solo career with 1989's Mr. Music Head, on which he played virtually all the instruments (with the exception of double bass). The album was split between relatively straightforward pop and more experimental songs, with a strong emphasis on Belew's signature electric tones, plus plenty of percussion and an unusual approach to acoustic production. Mr. Music Head also generated a hit single (No. 5 on the US Modern Rock chart) in the shape of "Oh Daddy," on which Belew duetted with his 11-year-old daughter Audie.

In 1990, Belew produced a similar follow-up with Young Lions. This featured a number of cover versions, plus two guest appearances by his past and current employer David Bowie, who'd hired Belew as musical director for his then-current Sound+Vision Tour. The album generated another US Modern rock chart hit (No. 2) with the Belew-and-Bowie duet "Pretty Pink Rose," and a minor hit on the same chart with the subsequent single, "Men In Helicopters" (No. 17).

The following year, Belew released Desire of the Rhino King, a compilation of digitally remastered material from his first three (now out-of-print) albums.

The next phase in Belew's career saw him pursuing a more traditional singing and songwriting style (albeit with his trademark unusual guitar tones), which owed a lot to his old heroes the Beatles. 1992's Inner Revolution, and 1994's Here (as well as 1993's self-explanatory and back-catalogue-revisiting The Acoustic Adrian Belew) were all heavily song-oriented and accessible, but sold less than Belew expected. 1996's Op Zop Too Wah blended Belew's solid songwriting approach with more avant-garde instrumental coloration.

In parallel to Belew's work with a revived King Crimson, he released the first in a proposed Experimental Guitar Series, The Guitar as Orchestra: Experimental Guitar Series, Vol. 1, in 1997. A return to the all-instrumental avant-garde territories of Desire Caught by the Tail, this was an album of atonal contemporary classical music entirely realized on MIDI guitar using digital models of orchestral instruments. Belew has mentioned plans for releasing more records in the Experimental Guitar series, including one called The Animal Kingdom, but to date, no more have been released (probably due to the modest sales of the first volume).

Belew's subsequent releases were two more acoustic albums, 1998's Belew Prints: The Acoustic Adrian Belew, Vol. 2, and the 1999 Salad Days compilation, as well as the Coming Attractions album of works-in-progress. In 2004, he collaborated on a spoken-word-and-instrumentation album with Kevin Max, called Raven Songs 101. Between 2005 and 2007, Belew released the Side series of albums:  2005's Side One and Side Two, 2006's Side Three, and 2007's Side Four, with a variety of guest performers, including Tool's Danny Carey and Primus' Les Claypool.

In April and May 2006, Adrian toured Australia with local musicians John Prior from Matt Finish playing drums, and Al Slavik playing bass guitar and Stick (as well as singing backing vocals). In August 2006, he performed in Atlanta, Georgia, on The Acoustic Planet Tour with Bela Fleck & the Flecktones and Umphrey's McGee.

Later in 2006, Belew formed a new long-term trio, which his fans rapidly christened the Adrian Belew Power Trio, featuring former Paul Green School of Rock students Eric Slick on drums and Julie Slick on bass. This band featured on the 2007 live recording Side Four and the 2009 download-only Live Overseas.

In 2008, Belew played at the Adelaide Guitar Festival. In June 2009, the Adrian Belew Power Trio released an all-new studio record titled simply e., featuring a five-part long-form Belew instrumental composition. During the same month, Belew released A Cup of Coffee and a Slice of Time, an album credited to "Clay & Belew." This was an album of improvised classical-based interpretations of Belew songs (both solo and from King Crimson) mostly performed by pianist Michael Clay, with additional guitar, cello, and music concrete contributions from Belew.

Belew has been a frequent contributor to Nine Inch Nails, guesting on the albums The Downward Spiral, The Fragile, Ghosts I–IV and Hesitation Marks. The group's frontman Trent Reznor briefly named Belew as the group's touring guitarist in 2013, but he ultimately left the group before playing any live dates.  

On January 16, 2019, Belew announced an expansion of his "Power Trio" to a quartet and 2019 tour.  Band members are Jordan Perlson on drums, Saul Zonana on keyboards, guitar, and vocals, and bassist Julie Slick.

In 2022, Belew participated in the "Celebrating David Bowie" tour, featuring Angelo Moore, Todd Rundgren, and others.

FLUX apps

Most recently, Belew has moved into working with mobile app platforms via his self-designed iOS apps FLUX:FX – the professional audio multi-effects app and FLUX by belew™, which contain over three hundred audio tracks and pieces of artwork that he describes as "never playing the same twice." FLUX:FX is a real-time audio manipulation app for the iPad that he said "lets me make sounds that I can't get with any other gear." Both apps have gathered significant industry recognition, including being honored twice in the 2015 Webby Awards and receiving a 'best of the best'  at the 2015 Red Dot Design Awards.

Musical style

Although he has frequently worked as a lead singer, Belew is best known as a guitar player with a highly unusual but accessible playing style (featuring bizarre electronic tones, unorthodox playing techniques, and a wide variety of sonic effects, including guitar-based impressions of animals, birds, insects, vehicles, and mechanical noise). Among his best-known guitar playing is the riff to Tom Tom Club's "Genius of Love," the overdriven solos on Talking Heads' "The Great Curve," the wild whammy-bar melodies on his own Top 10 hit "Oh Daddy," and the careening elephant impressions on King Crimson's "Elephant Talk."

Part of Belew's sound creation involves physical techniques including tapping, pick scrapes, bending the neck, unorthodox use of the guitar slide, and occasional employment of objects (such as files) to attack the strings. In his riffs, he generally includes fret intonation work, and is even known to produce sounds from off the fret board, including the stringed portion of the nut and bridge. He is widely considered to be a master of the tremolo arm (whammy bar), something which he humorously referred to in his song "Twang Bar King" (which itself features a whammy-bar solo).

Belew uses a wide variety of heavily synthesized and electronically altered guitar tones. Over the years he has become known for playing various guitars processed through an immense array of electronic effects devices ("I'm surrounded by guitar pedals, though. I can't step out the ring I'm surrounded in without stepping on a pedal," he told Adelaide.now in 2008.) He has also stated that he composes specifically for certain amps and effects. Lamenting the demise of one specific amplifier made by now-defunct Johnson Amplification, he said, "I wrote specific sounds and types of looping and things that I just can't seem to make other amps do." While he has used many brands of effects pedals, Electro Harmonix was one of his mainstays.

Belew is a pioneer of guitar synthesizers, having been one of the first players to bring them to, and consistently use them in, popular music. In the late 1970s and early 1980s, he was a user of the Roland GR300 (alongside Andy Summers, Pat Metheny, and Robert Fripp). In the late 1980s and the 1990s, he used the Roland GR1. He now favors the Line 6 Variax digital modelling system. In the early 1980s, Belew was notable for owning and using a rare Roland GR505 fretless guitar synthesizer.

Belew's first guitar was a Gibson Firebird that he bought for $170. Belew now has a signature Parker Fly guitar, the company's first.

Belew has also been seen playing an extraordinarily flexible rubber-neck guitar in the Laurie Anderson film Home of the Brave and in the video for his 1989 single "Oh Daddy." In 2007, he revealed that the guitar's neck was rubber containing "metal vertebrae" and that it was solely a visual (and unplayable) prop.

As a singer, Belew is noted for the distinct, nasal, sometimes manic feel of his vocals. His singing voice is often compared to that of Talking Heads' David Byrne, with whom Belew worked between 1979 and 1981.

In addition to his singing and guitar playing talents, Belew is an accomplished drummer and percussionist, and also plays bass guitar, upright bass, keyboards, and cello.

Belew has cited Jimi Hendrix, the Beatles, Jeff Beck, Igor Stravinsky, and George Gershwin as particular influences. He has also cited Spike Jones as an influence for the goofy and absurdist humor that occasionally appears in his lyrics.

Equipment setup
In 2010, Guitar Geek interviewed Belew's guitar technician André Cholmondeley, creating a list and diagram of Belew's guitar setup at the time.

An instructional video from 1984 shows he also used an A/DA Flanger, an Electro-Harmonix Octave Multiplexer, an Electro-Harmonix 16 Second Digital Delay, an Electro-Harmonix Frequency Analyzer, two Foxx Tone Machine Fuzzes, a Boss DM-2 Delay, an Electro-Harmonix Micro Synthesizer, an MXR Dyna Comp, a Pitch-Voltage Synthesizer, 3 Boss Volume Pedals, two MXR 10 band graphic equalizers, a Roland GR-300 Guitar Synthesizer, a Boss pedal switcher, an Electro-Harmonix Big Muff, an Electro-Harmonix Foot Controller, a tape loop machine, and an Electro-Harmonix Stereo Polychorus.

Belew is always adjusting his live setup, and according to audio engineer Daniel Rowland, he uses an Axe-FX II, Liquid Foot 12+ controller, Roland VG-99, Kemper profiling amp, a Keeley Compressor pedal, Ableton Live (running on an Apple Macbook), Soundblox Multi-wave distortion, DigiTech HarmonyMan, iConnectMidi 4+, MOTU Ultralite 3 hybrid, Keith Mcmillen Instruments Softstep 2, and his own NOIISE FLUX:FX iPad app through the Bose L1 and Atomic monitoring wedges. This was the rig seen by fans on his 2019 tour.

Legacy

Many artists have expressed their admiration for Belew or have cited him as an influence, including Adam Jones of Tool, Steven Wilson, Henry Rollins, St. Vincent, Anneke van Giersbergen of the Gathering, Garry Roberts of the Boomtown Rats, William Rees of Mystery Jets, Nick Reinhart of Tera Melos, Josh Christian of Toxik, and Sean Worrell of Nero di Marte. In a 1994 interview with Guitar Player magazine, Trent Reznor described Adrian Belew as "the most awesome musician in the world."

Session credits and other work

Belew is well regarded for his contributions, particularly on guitar, to various other artists' recordings.

In the 1980s, following his work with Talking Heads, he became an in-demand session player. Among the albums he contributed to during this period were Ryuichi Sakamoto's Left-handed Dream in 1981, Joan Armatrading's The Key in 1983, Peter Wolf's Lights Out and Jean Michel Jarre's Zoolook (both in 1984), Cyndi Lauper's True Colors and Paul Simon's Graceland (both in 1986), and Mike Oldfield's Earth Moving in 1989. During the mid-1980s, he frequently worked with Laurie Anderson, appearing on 1983's Mister Heartbreak album and her subsequent concert film, Home of the Brave (in which, among other things, he mimed playing on a specially constructed rubber-neck guitar and wore a paper bag over his head). In his 1984 instructional video Electronic Guitar, Belew explained and demonstrated the technology and techniques used to create some of his signature music.

In 1993, Belew played "synthesized guitar" on the song "God Shuffled His Feet" by Crash Test Dummies and also contributed to Sara Hickman's Necessary Angels album. In 1994, he first established himself as Trent Reznor's guest guitarist of choice, contributing to four Nine Inch Nails albums over the next nineteen years (The Downward Spiral, The Fragile, Ghosts I-IV, and Hesitation Marks). He worked again with Laurie Anderson on her 1994 album, Bright Red. During the 2000s, Belew was prominently featured on Tori Amos's 2001 album of cover versions, Strange Little Girls, and played on William Shatner's second musical album, Has Been, in 2004. In 2005, he featured as "primary guitarist" on the album Habitat by progressive rock band Man on Fire and contributed two solos to Porcupine Tree's album Deadwing. In 2006 and 2007, Belew contributed to two Pink Floyd tribute albums produced by Billy Sherwood: Back Against the Wall, and Return to the Dark Side of the Moon.

In 2016, Belew scored the Pixar short film Piper, which was shown before Finding Dory in theaters. He also featured on the album The News by Italian progressive/eclectic rock band N.y.X.

In 2021 Adrian joined the band Turkuaz and Jerry Harrison to tour in celebration of Remain in Light’s 40th anniversary.

Belew as producer

In 1983, Belew produced the eponymous debut album for the Raisins. In 1985, he produced the Elvis Brothers's second album, Adventure Time.

During the 1990s, he began making more of a name for himself as a producer, most notably producing two tracks on Jars of Clay's debut album in 1995 (including the crossover Christian hit "Flood"), but also producing the Irresponsibles' 1999 album, When Pigs Fly.

Belew has also produced and played on albums by three Mexican rock bands: Caifanes's 1992 album, El silencio; Santa Sabina's 1994 album, Símbolos, and Jaguares' 2005 album, Cronicas de un Laberinto.

Belew was credited as co-producer and musician on Kevin Max's 2001 album, Stereotype Be.

Belew as instrument designer

Belew has also worked in instrument design, collaborating with Parker Guitars to help design his own Parker Fly signature guitar. This guitar is noticeably different from the standard design, containing advanced electronics, such as a sustainer pickup and a Line 6 Variax guitar modelling system. It is also MIDI-capable, allowing it to be used with any synthesizer with MIDI connectivity.

Appearances in other media

Belew has appeared in a series of Japanese advertisements promoting the chemical and electronics company Daikin in which he emulated animal noises with his guitar and appeared as the conductor, conducting a symphony in which all the members were versions of himself playing guitar.

Discography

Studio albums
Lone Rhino (1982)
Twang Bar King (1983)
Desire Caught By the Tail (1986)
Mr. Music Head (1989)
Young Lions (1990)
Inner Revolution (1992)
The Acoustic Adrian Belew (1993)
Here (1994)
The Experimental Guitar Series Volume 1: The Guitar as Orchestra (1995)
Op Zop Too Wah (1996)
Belew Prints: The Acoustic Adrian Belew, Vol. 2 (1998)
Salad Days (1999)
Side One (2004)
Side Two (2005)
Side Three (2006)
e (2009)
Pop-Sided (2019)
Elevator (2022)

Live albums
Side Four (2007)
Live Overseas (2009)

Compilations
Desire of the Rhino King (1991) – compilation derived from first three albums
Coming Attractions (2000)
Idiom' on Classwar Karaoke 0031 Survey (2015)

Other releases
with Kevin Max: Raven Songs 101 (2004)
as Clay & Belew: A Cup Of Coffee and a Slice of Time (2009)
with the New Czars: Doomsday Revolution (2010)
via iOS application: "FLUX by belew" (2014)
FLUX by belew. Volume One (2016)
FLUX by belew. Volume Two (2017)

Contributions (selection)
with Frank Zappa
1979: Sheik Yerbouti ("Flakes", "Jones Crusher", "City of Tiny Lites")
1983: Baby Snakes Soundtrack
1992: You Can't Do That on Stage Anymore, Vol. 6 [2CD] ("The Poodle Lecture", "Is That Guy Kidding Or What?", "White Person", "Tryin' To Grow A Chin")
2008: One Shot Deal ("Heidelberg", recorded February 24, 1978)
2010: Hammersmith Odeon (recorded Jan–Feb 1978) [3CD]
with David Bowie
1978: Stage (recorded Apr–May 1978) [2CD]
1979: Lodger ("Fantastic Voyage", "Move On", "Red Sails", "DJ", "Boys Keep Swinging", "Repetition", "Red Money")
with Talking Heads & David Byrne
1980: Remain in Light
1981: The Catherine Wheel
1982: The Name of This Band Is Talking Heads
with King Crimson
1981: Discipline
1982: Beat
1984: Three of a Perfect Pair
1994: Vrooom EP
1995: Thrak
1996: Thrakattak
2000: the construKction of light
2001: Vrooom Vrooom
2003: The Power to Believe
with Herbie Hancock
1981: Magic Windows
with Tom Tom Club
1981: Tom Tom Club
with Ryuichi Sakamoto
1981: Left-handed Dream
1990: The Arrangement 
1994: Soundbytes
with Joe Cocker
1982: Sheffield Steel
with Jean Michel Jarre
1984: Zoolook
with Laurie Anderson
1984: Mister Heartbreak
1986: Home of the Brave (soundtrack)
1994: Bright Red
with Cyndi Lauper
1986: True Colors
with Paul Simon
1986: Graceland
1990: The Rhythm of the Saints
with the Bears
1987: The Bears
1988: Rise and Shine
2001: Car Caught Fire
2007: Eureka!
with Mike Oldfield
1989: Earth Moving
with Nine Inch Nails
1994: The Downward Spiral
1999: The Fragile
2008: Ghosts I-IV
2013: Hesitation Marks
with Sara Hickman
1998 Two Kinds of Laughter
with Béla Fleck & the Flecktones
2000: Outbound
with William Shatner
2004: Has Been
with Porcupine Tree
2005: Deadwing
with Tony Levin
2006: Resonator
with N.y.X
2016: The News

with Gizmodrome
2017: Gizmodrome

with Turkuaz
2020: Ophidiophobia
2022: Apollyon

Singles

References

Further reading

External links

 
 
 Adrian Belew Interview NAMM Oral History Library (2015)

1949 births
American rock guitarists
American male guitarists
American session musicians
Avant-garde guitarists
Discipline Global Mobile artists
Island Records artists
Atlantic Records artists
Caroline Records artists
King Crimson members
Lead guitarists
Living people
Progressive rock guitarists
Rock musicians from Kentucky
Nine Inch Nails members
People from Covington, Kentucky
Tom Tom Club members
Songwriters from Kentucky
Singers from Kentucky
Guitarists from Kentucky
20th-century American guitarists
Gizmodrome members